Bala Kəngərli (also, Balakəngərli, Bala Kengerli and Bala-Kengerly) is a village and municipality in the Tartar Rayon of Azerbaijan.  It has a population of 560.

References 

Populated places in Tartar District